Citizens' Initiative (CI) is a social-liberal and reformist political party in Andorra led by Sergi Ricart.

History
Established in 2012, the party ran in the 2015 parliamentary elections as part of a coalition with the Social Democratic Party, the Greens and independents. In the constituency elections the alliance received 24% of the vote but failed to win a seat. However, it also received 24% of the proportional representation vote, winning three seats. The coalition was dissolved in April 2017.

References

External links

Political parties in Andorra
Political parties established in 2012
2012 establishments in Andorra